The Schau- und Sichtungsgarten Hermannshof (2.2 hectares), also known as the Hermannshof Weinheim, is a botanical garden at Babostraße 5, Weinheim, Baden-Württemberg, Germany. It is open daily in the summer and weekdays in the winter, and admission is free.

Today's garden was first established as a private garden over 200 years ago. It was acquired by the Freudenberg industrialist family in 1888, and in the 1920s, it was redesigned by landscape architect Heinrich Friedrich Wiepking-Jürgenmann. In 1981 to 1983, it was again redesigned as a public garden by landscape architect Hans Luz of Stuttgart. It is now a scientific institution jointly owned by the Freudenberg Company and the town of Weinheim.

The garden cultivates about 2500 taxa arranged in naturalistic plantings, including two theme gardens: a peony collection (created 1998) and North American prairie garden (2001, 1500 m²) containing over 350 plants. It also contains a number of notable trees, including specimens of Platanus orientalis and Platanus × hispanica that are over 230 years old, as well as Cedrus atlantica, Ginkgo biloba, Magnolia denudata, Magnolia × soulangeana, Myrtus communis, and Sequoia dating from the late 19th century.

See also 
 Exotenwald Weinheim
 List of botanical gardens in Germany

External links 

 Schau- und Sichtungsgarten Hermannshof
 Garden map
 Garden brochure
 Qype entry, with photographs
 GardenVisit entry
 Ultraviolet and bee vision photography done at Hermannshof

Botanical gardens in Germany
Gardens in Baden-Württemberg
Buildings and structures in Weinheim